MRN may refer to:

Businesses and organizations
 Macquarie Media (ASX: MRN), an Australian media company
 Michigan Radio Network, a satellite-distributed news service in Michigan, U.S.
 Migrants Rights Network, a London-based non-governmental organisation
 Motor Racing Network, the principal radio broadcasting operation of auto racing organization NASCAR
 National Regeneration Movement (Spanish: Movimiento Regeneración Nacional), a political party in Mexico

Military
 AN/MRN-1, an instrument approach localizer used by the U.S. Army Air Force during and after World War II
 AN/MRN-2, a radio range set used by the U.S. Army Air Force during and after World War II
 AN/MRN-3, a marker beacon set used by the U.S. Army Air Force during and after World War II

Science
 Magnetic resonance neurography, a medical imaging technique
 Median raphe nucleus, area within the brain
 MRN complex, a protein complex involved in DNA repair

Other uses
 Foothills Regional Airport, IATA airport code
 Major Road Network, a proposed classification of local authority roads in England